Claude Stanley Jameson (January 20, 1886 – February 12, 1943) was an American amateur soccer player who competed in the 1904 Summer Olympics. He was born in St. Louis, Missouri and died in Los Angeles, California. In 1904 he was a member of the St. Rose Parish team, which won the bronze medal in the soccer tournament. He played all four matches as a forward.

References

External links
profile

1886 births
1943 deaths
American soccer players
Footballers at the 1904 Summer Olympics
Olympic bronze medalists for the United States in soccer
Soccer players from Missouri
Medalists at the 1904 Summer Olympics
Association football forwards